The Eyes Open Tour was a concert tour by the Scottish/Northern Irish alternative rock band Snow Patrol. It was launched in support of the group's 2006 album Eyes Open. The band visited numerous international venues from 2006 through 2007. The tour is the collective name of many smaller tours and festivals Snow Patrol has played in support of their album. The tour officially commenced on 14 February 2006 with a "secret gig" called SG#3.

The tour saw the band visit continents like Europe, North America, Australia and Asia. The band headlined on almost all dates, and various acts supported them throughout. The tour was however marred by cancellations, mainly because of vocalist Gary Lightbody's throat problems and bassist Paul Wilson's shoulder injury. Additionally, other events happened with all other band members but no dates were affected. Drummer Jonny Quinn broke his arm, but no shows were cancelled as friend Graham Hopkins pitched in to take up drumming duties. Keyboardist Tom Simpson was arrested for drug charges, but was released in time for the next concert. Guitarist Nathan Connolly sprained his ankle and foot, but sat through shows till the injury healed. The band visited countries like New Zealand and Mexico for the first time and played their first concert in Southeast Asia during the course of the tour. The Eyes Open Tour also introduced the Tour Reporter feature, where fans were given the chance of covering their local concert.

Snow Patrol finished the tour, which went on for a year and a half, in September 2007 in Australia. The full tour spanned 214 dates and had 37 cancellations.

Tickets

Secret gigs and charity shows
Snow Patrol's official website initially offered tickets for the secret gig SG#3 to registered members on the forum. It was later announced that a limited number of tickets would be made available at Virgin Megastores, Royal Avenue, Belfast, Northern Ireland on 4 February 2006 at 9am. Tickets for SG#4 were only available to members of Snow Patrol's official website through an e-mail which contained all details. Winners received a non-transferable SMS ticket to their mobile phones. This SMS message was deemed invalid if forwarded. Additionally, these mobile tickets were the only way into the concert.

Tickets for Nottingham's Rock City went on general sale via the Rock City Box Office on 5 May 2006. Tickets were priced at £22.50 each. The official website ran a pre-sale for members. During the North American Tour of February–April 2007, the band played an intimate show for friend Diana Gualda. Tickets for this show went on general sale on 8 February 1pm (PST) via Ticketmaster. Tickets were priced at $30.

Tickets for the show at Live Earth were not available for general sale. Fans were required to register within a three-day period, starting 13 April 2007 at 12:00pm. The winners were chosen through a ballot, and they received an SMS containing details on how to obtain their tickets. Each ticket was priced at £55. The official website held back a few tickets for its members, which were given out through a pre-sale.

One-off shows
Tickets for the show at KOKO were available for pre-sale from 25 January 2006, 9am from Snow Patrol's official website for 24 hours and were limited to four tickets per person. The pre-sale password was posted on the forum half an hour before the sale. Any remaining tickets went on general sale on next morning from Gigsandtours and were priced £17.50. Later, the band's official website held a competition to give away the last two tickets. All 1,500 available tickets were sold out in less than ten minutes.

There were no tickets for the in-store performance at the Virgin Mega stores, Dublin. Entry to the concert required a wristband that could only be obtained from the store at 9am on the day of the gig. They were given out on a first come first served basis. The official website held a last minute competition for members to give away the last 100 wristbands. Tickets for the one-off O2 concert went on sale 18 May 9am and were priced at £25. They could be obtained from the Xfm Xchange, the Xfm Online Ticket Shop, Ticketmaster and Seetickets. For the secret O2 show, the band held back 1,000 tickets from general sale, and gave them away to the website members for free. Members were sent an e-mail containing details on how to win the tickets.

Festivals
Tickets for the Heineken Green Energy Festival went on sale on 10 February 2006 and could be purchased from Ticketmaster. They were priced at €34.50 each. Tickets for T on the Fringe went on general sale from 5 May 9am and those for Marlay Park from 12 May at 9am. Pre-sale of tickets for Marlay Park went on till 10 May. Tickets were priced at €44.50 and could be obtained from Ticketmaster. Fans, later, were also given the chance to win tickets through a competition where they were required to answer a question. A similar competition was also held to give away one ticket for T on the Fringe. It was later announced that more tickets were released, which could be obtained through Ticketmaster.

Tickets for the Eden Sessions were priced at £30 and were made available from Edenbookings. For Get Loaded in the Park, tickets were available through Ticketmaster. There was a special £20 early bird ticket scheme as promotion. Tickets for BBC Radio 1's Big Weekend were given out free via a draw through Radio 1's website. Tickets for Tennents ViTal went on general sale on 12 May 9am. They could be obtained online from Vital06.com, by telephone or in person from Virgin and Ticketmaster outlets. Tickets for the Isle of Man Festival were available only through the Islands Box Office or could be purchased by phone. The tickets were priced at £32.50 each. Tickets for the Splendour in the Grass side-shows were available from Ticketek and Ticketmaster. Tickets for the Isle of Wight festival on 21 February 2006 via VirginRadio, and tickets were made available from usual ticket outlets like Ticketmaster 22 February 9am. Tickets for T in the Park went on sale on 24 February 9am. They could be purchased through Ticketmaster. Snow Patrol's official website held a competition to give away two tickets for T in the Park. Fans were required to create a video to the soundtrack of Signal Fire. Tickets for the V Festival went on general sale on 1 March 9am. They could be purchased through Ticketmaster.

UK and Ireland tour, 2006
Tickets for the UK and Ireland tour of 2006 went on general sale on 8 February 9am and were priced at £17.50. Tickets could be obtained from Seetickets except for the Glasgow show which was through Ticketmaster. The Dublin date went on general sale 10 February, and tickets were priced at €34.50. Tickets could only be obtained from Ticketmaster. A competition was also held, where fans could enter and win tickets. The winners were announced through a draw. Tickets for the final dates at the Ulster Hall went on sale on 18 February, and were priced between £19.50 and £22.50. They could only be obtained from Ticketmaster. Additional tickets for the shows at The Forum were later released, which could be obtained through Seetickets. For the additional date at the Wembley Arena, the official website members were given the opportunity of a pre-sale. Tickets were priced at £23.50 (excluding booking fee). General sale began on 21 May 9am, and tickets could be obtained through Ticketmaster and Seetickets. Later, extra seats for the 2 shows at Wembley were released. Tickets could be purchased from the venue's box office through phone or online, through Seetickets and Ticketmaster. After the Wembley date, another date for the Odyssey, Belfast was added. Tickets for this date went on sale on 22 August 9am via Ticketmaster. When tickets for the show sold out within three hours, an additional date was announced. Tickets for this show were made available on 22 August, and could be obtained through Ticketmaster.

US tour, 2006
Tickets for the seven-date US Tour of 2006 were made available through different online services like Ticketmaster, Ticketalternative, Ticketweb, through tickets for the San Francisco and Boston shows could be purchased on venue. General sale of tickets for the US Tour in May began on 8 April. Pre-sale, exclusively for members had begun a few days back. Pre-sales for later shows were held over the course of the next few months. General sale tickets could be obtained through Ticketmaster.

European tour, 2006
Tickets for the Vienna, Utrecht and Zurich shows on the European Tour of 2006 went on general sale on 21 July and those for the Copenhagen show, and all the German, shows on 28 July. Again, members on the band's official website were given the opportunity to purchase tickets early via a pre-sale.

UK & Ireland Winter Arena Tour
Tickets for the UK & Ireland Winter Arena Tour went on pre-sale to website members on 10 May 9am and continued till 12 May 9am. Tickets were limited to a maximum of 4 per household. General sale began as soon as the pre-sale ended. For the additional Wembley date, which was later added, the official website ran a pre-sale where tickets were priced at £23.50 each. General sale began on 21 May 9am. Tickets could be obtained through Ticketmaster and Seetickets. For the added Scottish show, the website ran a pre-sale exclusively for members. Tickets went on general sale on 14 July 9am. They could be obtained from Ticketmaster and Seetickets. The tickets were priced at £22.50 each. For the show at Bournemouth, the official website ran a pre-sale for members on 14 July 9am. The pre-sale ended as soon as tickets went up for general sale, which began on 17 July 9am. Tickets could be obtained through Ticketmaster and Seetickets and were priced at £22.50. Tickets for the Manchester show went on general sale on 20 October 9am. Tickets could be obtained through Seetickets, and were priced at £23.50 each. The tickets for this show sold out in 38 minutes, so another show was added. The other Manchester show's tickets were made available for general sale on 20 October. They could be obtained through Seetickets and Ticketmaster, and were priced at £24.00 each. Extra tickets for select dates were released after the tour had begun, which could only be purchased online. For the show at The Point, tickets went on general sale on 22 August 9am, and could be obtained through Ticketmaster.

European Tour, 2007
Tickets for the European Tour, which saw the band playing in Germany went on sale on 20 November 9am via Kartenhaus.de. An additional Dutch date was later added, and tickets for the show went on general sale on 25 November 9am (CET). Tickets for the show could be obtained from Easyticket.nl.

Australian tour, February 2007
Tickets for the Australian tour of 2007 initially went on pre-sale on 21 November and continued for a day. General sale began on 23 November and tickets could be obtained through Ticketek and Ticketmaster. For the New Zealand dates, the pre-sale began on 6 December 9am (NZDT). General sale began on 8 December and tickets were made available through Ticketmaster. Tickets for the second North American Tour initially went on pre-sale for website members. General sale began on 17 and 18 November, depending on the concert dates. Additional tickets for the Melbourne date were later released on 17 January 2007 at 9am. More tickets were released on 19 January at 9am. Tickets could be obtained through Ticketmaster.

North American tour, February–April 2007
Tickets for the tour went on general sale on 17 and 18 November 2006. Snow Patrol's official website members were given a pre-sale opportunity. A show in Chicago was announced later, and tickets for this show went on general sale on 2 December 12 pm (CST), and could be obtained through Ticketmaster. A few days before, the official website held a pre-sale for its members. Shows in Portland, Houston, Denver and Washington, D.C. were later added. Tickets for the Portland, Denver and Washington shows went on general sale on 9 December 10 am and those for Houston on 8 December 5pm. Three dates for Seattle, Universal City and San Francisco were later added. Tickets for these shows initially went on pre-sale for the official website members. General sale began on 16 and 17 December. Tickets could be obtained through Ticketmaster.

Japanese tour, April 2007
Tickets for the Japanese tour initially went on pre-sale exclusively for members of the band's official website on 1 September and continued till 4 September. General sale of tickets started on 16 September, which could be obtained from Eplus.jp. After the shows were rescheduled, tickets for the new dates went on general sale 23 December. Tickets for the original shows were deemed valid for each revised date, and an option of a refund was offered.

North American tour, July–August 2007
This leg of the tour saw the band play in Mexico for the first time. Tickets for this show went on sale on 28 January, were priced at 350 pesos, and could be obtained through Ticketmaster.

Australian tour, September 2007
The final leg of the tour was in Australia and New Zealand. Tickets for the Australian dates went on sale on 15 June via Ticketek. A pre-sale was held before the said date for website members. To add to it, the band offered a copy of Final Straw for every purchased ticket. Tickets for the New Zealand shows 18 July via Ticketek and Ticketmaster. Members again were given the chance of getting tickets early via a pre-sale.

Secret gigs
To generate buzz about the then upcoming album, Snow Patrol played a secret gig in Belfast in mid-February. The show was dubbed SG#3. Later, Snow Patrol's official website announced another secret gig, dubbed SG#4, in conjunction with Vodafone as part of their "To Be Announced" feature. It was held at the Royal Opera House in London on 26 April 2:30pm. Snow Patrol debuted three new songs for the 200-strong crowd: "Hands Open", "Chasing Cars" and "Make This Go on Forever". The concert was later shown on E4 the same weekend and Channel 4 on 5 May 11pm.

Tour dates

Set list
"Wow"
"Hands Open"
"Chocolate"
"It's Beginning to Get to Me"
"Spitting Games"
"Headlights on Dark Roads"
"Grazed Knees"
"Chasing Cars"
"An Olive Grove Facing the Sea"
"Shut Your Eyes"
"How to Be Dead"
"Make this Go on Forever"
"Ways and Means"
"Run"
"You're All I Have"
Encore
<li>"Open Your Eyes"
<li>"Tiny Little Fractures"
Set list at SG#3.

Set list
"Wow"
"Chocolate"
"It's Beginning to Get to Me"
"Spitting Games"
"Hands Open"
"Shut Your Eyes"
"Chasing Cars"
"How to Be Dead"
"The Finish Line"
"Run"
"You’re All I Have"
Set list at SG#4.

European Tour (Leg I)
After the secret gigs and the KOKO show, Snow Patrol kicked off touring for Eyes Open by undertaking a small European tour. The tour included an acoustic show by Lightbody and Connolly for Dutch channel 3VOOR12.

Tour dates

US Tour (Leg I)
After the European Tour winded, the band headed to the United States to play a further 7 dates. One of these dates was at the SXSW Festival. Though the tour was called US Tour, it included a lone date in Canada. During the tour, the band played an intimate session for AOL Music in Manhattan. This performance was later released as a live EP on the iTunes Store as sessions@AOL.

Tour dates

UK & Ireland Tour
Snow Patrol undertook a short UK & Ireland Tour to coincide with the release of Eyes Open on 1 May. The tour began at Dublin Castle (at the Heineken Green Energy Festival) and was to finish with two nights at The Forum, London. But due to tickets selling out quickly and the success of SG#3, an additional date was added at the Ulster Hall. Later, support acts were confirmed. A news item on the official website said that the band intended to include different acts on different dates.

Tour dates

US Tour (Leg II)
Snow Patrol next did a month-long tour of US and Canada, following a hugely successful SXSW appearance and a sold out US Tour in March. The Duke Spirit and Augustana were booked as support acts. The tour included an in-store performance at HMV to kick off the Canadian dates. An autograph session was held after the set. The band chose Denver specifically to be the location of the first concert. They had kept the city as a surprise location on a previous tour two years before and had visited there for the first time, expect lukewarm reaction. However, the concert sold out and the band had made it a point to return in the future.

A few shows were cancelled initially as vocalist Gary Lightbody's voice had worn out. He had been advised by his doctor to take a week's rest before the tour as he had developed laryngitis (polyps on vocal cords), but he preferred not to because of the pre-booked tour. Tests later showed that Lightbody's voice had not healed at all, he had lost his top range, and the band was forced to cancel all remaining shows. The initially cancelled shows were rescheduled to the end of the tour. Lightbody credited the band's agent and managers for their quick work.

However, the first two rescheduled shows had to be cancelled as the part of band couldn't get flight tickets to the US due to flight delays caused by the Heathrow Terrorist Plot. Connolly and Simpson had made it to the US, but the rest of the band couldn't. Later, a whole new set of dates was announced with two additional radio shows. After getting his voice back, Lightbody gave up drinking on tour in order to preserve his voice, on advice on his doctor (who also works with pop singer Celine Dion). Although he felt ashamed of it before, he hired a vocal coach after finding that Johnny Rotten had one when he was a Sex Pistol. He also started to do vocal warm-ups before shows, and requested a separate area for him to do his exercises, away from "the band laughing at [him]."

Augustana returned as the support act for all rescheduled shows, and Martha Wainwright, who had previously worked with the band for the song "Set the Fire to the Third Bar", supported the band on a select few dates. On 29 August, the band appeared as musical guests on The Tonight Show. The band performed "Chasing Cars", which was #6 on the singles chart in the United States then.

Tour dates
{| class="wikitable" style="text-align:center;"
! width="200"| Date
! width="200"| City
! width="150"| Country
! width="300"| Venue
|-
! colspan="4"| Support acts: The Duke Spirit & Augustana
|-
|23 May 2006
|Denver
|rowspan="4"|United States
|Paramount Theatre
|-
|25 May 2006
|Dallas
|The Granada Theater
|-
|26 May 2006
|Austin
|Stubb's B-B-Q
|-
|27 May 2006
|Houston
|Verizon Wireless Theater
|-
|29 May 2006
|Atlanta
|rowspan="5"|United States
|Roxy Theatre (CANCELLED)
|-
|31 May 2006
|Washington, D.C.
|9:30 Club (CANCELLED)
|-
|2 June 2006
|Boston
|The Avalon (CANCELLED)
|-
|3 June 2006
|New York City
|Roseland Ballroom (CANCELLED)
|-
|5 June 2006
|Philadelphia
|Electric Factory (CANCELLED)
|-
|6 June 2006
|Montreal
|rowspan="2"|Canada
|Quebec Metropolis Centre (CANCELLED)
|-
|7 June 2006
|Toronto
|Kool Haus (CANCELLED)
|-
|9 June 2006
|Pontiac
|rowspan="3"|United States
|Clutch Cargo's (CANCELLED)
|-
|10 June 2006
|Chicago
|The Vic Theatre (CANCELLED)
|-
|11 June 2006
|Minneapolis
|First Avenue (CANCELLED)
|-
|13 June 2006
|rowspan="2"|Vancouver
|rowspan="2"|Canada
|HMV in Robson Street (CANCELLED)
|-
|14 June 2006
|Commodore Ballroom (CANCELLED)
|-
|15 June 2006
|Seattle
|rowspan="7"|United States
|Paramount Theatre (CANCELLED)
|-
|16 June 2006
|Portland
|Roseland Theater (CANCELLED)
|-
|18 June 2006
|San Francisco
|The Warfield (CANCELLED)
|-
|19 June 2006
|rowspan="2"|Los Angeles
|rowspan="2"|The Wiltern LG (CANCELLED)
|-
|20 June 2006
|-
|22 June 2006
|Atlanta
|The Tabernacle (CANCELLED)|-
|23 June 2006
|Washington, D.C.
|9:30 Club (CANCELLED)|-
|25 June 2006
|Toronto
|Canada
|Kool Haus (CANCELLED)|-
|26 June 2006
|Philadelphia
|rowspan="2"|United States
|Electric Factory (CANCELLED)|-
|27 June 2006
|New York City
|Roseland Ballroom (CANCELLED)|-
! colspan="4"| Rescheduled tour starts
|-
|12 August 2006
|Auburn
|rowspan="5"|United States
|White River Amphitheatre (CANCELLED)|-
|13 August 2006
|Portland
|Tom McCall Waterfront Park (CANCELLED)'|-
|12 August 2006
|Seattle
|KNDD 107.7 FM
|-
|13 August 2006
|Portland
|KNRK 94.7 FM
|-
|15 August 2006
|Boston
|Bank of America Pavilion
|-
! colspan="4"| Support act: Augustana
|-
|6 September 2006
|Atlanta
|United States
|The Tabernacle
|-
! colspan="4"| Support acts: Augustana & Martha Wainwright
|-
|8 September 2006
|New York City
|United States
|Roseland Ballroom
|-
! colspan="4"| Support act: Augustana
|-
|9 September 2006
|Philadelphia
|rowspan="2"|United States
|Electric Factory
|-
|10 September 2006
|Washington, D.C.
|9:30 Club
|-
|12 September 2006
|Montreal
|rowspan="2"|Canada
|Quebec Metropolis Centre
|-
|13 September 2006
|Toronto
|Kool Haus
|-
|14 September 2006
|Detroit
|rowspan="4"|United States
|Clutch Cargo's
|-
|16 September 2006
|Chicago
|Riviera Theatre
|-
|17 September 2006
|Minneapolis
|First Avenue
|-
|20 September 2006
|Seattle
|Moore Theatre
|-
|21 September 2006
|Vancouver
|Canada
|PNE Forum
|-
|23 September 2006
|Portland
|rowspan="2"|United States
|Roseland Theater
|-
|24 September 2006
|San Francisco
|The Warfield
|-
! colspan="4"| Support acts: Augustana & Martha Wainwright
|-
|26 September 2006
|rowspan="2"|Los Angeles
|rowspan="2"|United States
|rowspan="2"|The Wiltern LG
|-
|27 September 2006
|-
! colspan="4"| Support act: Augustana
|-
|28 September 2006
|San Diego
|rowspan="2"|United States
|House of Blues
|-
|30 September 2006
|Las Vegas
|The Joint
|}

European Tour (Leg II)
In October, Snow Patrol embarked on a second European Tour. The tour saw them visit countries like Norway, Denmark, Switzerland, Austria, Germany and France. Artists like The Cinematics, Declan O'Rourke, Asyl and Joseph D'Anvers supported the band throughout the tour on different dates. Midway through the tour, Paul Wilson injured his left arm and shoulder. The bassist had been having a little muscle strain, but he had ignored the pain and carried on playing. It built up and became too much for him to play on-stage. As a result, four French and two German dates were cancelled.

Tour dates

UK & Ireland Winter Arena Tour
Snow Patrol embarked on a tour of the UK & Ireland in winter 2006, which they headlined. They were supported on by a number of support acts. The tour kicked off in late November and continued till the end of December. The tour included shows at the historic Point Theatre in Dublin. The tour was played in two legs. Midway thorough the tour, the band headed to the US to play some radio shows.

Martha Wainwright was replaced as female lead vocalist for "Set the Fire to the Third Bar" because of her commitments in the studio. Lisa Hannigan, who had previously worked with Gary Lightbody on the song "Some Surprise" for the charity album The Cake Sale, and Miriam Kaufmann, longtime friend of the band joined the band on tour as touring members, singing female vocals on the song for one half of the tour each. Iain Archer and Declan O'Rourke were recruited to play acoustic guitar, with Lightbody praising them as two of the best guitar players and two of the most favorite people the band had ever met. Ben Dumville and Colm MacAthlaoich played trumpet on "An Olive Grove Facing the Sea", as they'd always done. The tour saw the band play a 21-song set, which included the band's first release "Starfighter Pilot".

Tour dates

Typical set list
"Spitting Games"
"Wow"
"Chocolate"
"It's Beginning to Get to Me"
"Headlights on Dark Roads"
"Starfighter Pilot"
"How to Be Dead"
"You are My Joy"
"Grazed Knees"
"Chasing Cars"
"Shut Your Eyes"
"An Olive Grove Facing the Sea"
"Set the Fire to the Third Bar"
"Somewhere a Clock is Ticking"
"Make this Go on Forever"
"Ways and Means"
"Run"
"You're All I Have"
Encore
<li>"The Finish Line"
<li>"Open Your Eyes"
<li>"Tiny Little Fractures"

US Christmas radio shows
In the middle of the Winter Arena Tour, Snow Patrol headed to the United States to play a few radio shows. They resumed the second leg of the Winter Arena Tour after finishing playing on these shows.

Tour dates

European Tour (Leg III)
Snow Patrol kicked off touring for 2007 by doing a short, four date tour of Germany. An additional date in Amsterdam was added later.

Ahead of the tour, drummer Jonny Quinn broke his arm in a snowboarding accident in the French Alps. The band had to cancel several of their shows before on the tour, when bassist Paul Wilson injured his arm and shoulder, and when vocalist Gary Lightbody developed laryngitis and lost his voice. Not wanting to cancel shows, the band recruited longtime friend Graham Hopkins to replace Quinn. Hopkins got one rehearsal to learn his drum parts before the tour dates began. Quinn was expected to return for the Australian Tour, but however his injuries healed in time for the US tour which started late February 2007.

Tour dates

Australian Tour (Leg I)
Snow Patrol played a short, three-date tour of Australia in mid-February. They were supported by Australian bands Howling Bells and Red Riders. The shows were Snow Patrol's largest Australian shows then.

To celebrate the album reaching #1 in New Zealand, the band added a date for New Zealand on the tour. This show became their first ever in the country. Hopkins continued to drum on this tour for the still injured Quinn.

Tour dates

North American Tour (Leg I)
After the Australian tour, Snow Patrol headlined a North American Tour. Support acts for all shows were OK Go and Silversun Pickups. The tour schedule had them covering various cities in the United States, playing a few dates in Canada and playing their first ever show in Mexico. The Mexican show, though had to be cancelled as the band was unaware of the 48-hour wait to get their equipment through customs. The show was rescheduled to 26 July.

Quinn returned to resume drumming duties on this tour. Midway through the tour however, lead guitarist Nathan Connolly badly sprained his foot and ankle. Though it was not possible for him to put any weight on his foot, the management assured fans that no shows would be cancelled and Connolly would most likely be sitting in the shows. The tour began in February end and continued till mid-April, after which the band headed to Japan to play shows that had been rescheduled from February.

Tour dates

Typical set list
"Spitting Games"
"It's Beginning to Get to Me"
"Chocolate"
"Headlights on Dark Roads"
"How to Be Dead"
"Grazed Knees"
"Chasing Cars"
"Shut Your Eyes"
"Set the Fire to the Third Bar"
"Somewhere a Clock is Ticking"
"Make this Go on Forever"
"Ways and Means"
"Run"
"You're All I Have"
Encore
<li>"The Finish Line"
<li>"Open Your Eyes"
<li>"Hands Open"

Japanese Tour
After playing successfully at the Fuji Rock Festival in the summer, the band returned to Japan in 2007 to play a short four date tour. The shows, scheduled to be held in February were cancelled and rescheduled to April. Tickets for the previous shows were deemed valid for the new dates.

Tour dates

North American Tour (Leg II)
After spending the summer playing at various rock festivals, Snow Patrol headlined another North American Tour. Hot Hot Heat acted as the support on all dates of the tour. The tour saw the band visit various venues in US and Canada. The tour also included a lone date in Mexico City, which was the earlier show on the previous North American Tour that had to be cancelled.

In between the tour, the band also played at the Lollapalooza Festival. It was later announced that the band had been forced to cancel the last two shows. A refund was offered to fans who had bought tickets. The tour began in mid-July and continued till early August.

Tour dates

One-off shows
On Zane Lowe's radio show aired on 24 January 2006, it was announced that Snow Patrol were to play a one-off show at KOKO on 12 April. The band was supported by The Spinto Band & Desert Hearts, which would go on to again support Snow Patrol on their UK & Ireland Tour. Later, a day before kicking off their UK & Ireland Tour of May 2006, the band played a lone date at the Virgin Megastores in Dundrum.

While playing at various music festivals in July 2006, the band played a one-off show in Leeds. They were supported by Ed Harcourt on the show. In August 2006, while playing at various rock festivals around Europe, the band played a lone show at Douglas, Isle of Man. Republic of Loose supported them at the concert. In September 2006, they played an acoustic show for Virgin Radio listeners. Before the show, the band signed an Epiphone SG Special guitar, which was given away on Ben Jones' Most Wanted show two days later, when the concert was broadcast.

Snow Patrol played at National Public Radio's World Cafe in February 2007, a session that could be heard on nearly 200 stations around the world. The band played for the Philadelphia station WXPN. The set was rebroadcast on 3 and 5 March 2007. In June 2007, the band played two one-off shows, one at London's O2 Arena, and another at King Tut's. The show at King Tut's was free and sponsored by Xfm. At the London show, the band was supported by Ash and The Twilight Sad. This was the last UK headline show Snow Patrol played in 2007. It was later announced that there would a secret show at the O2 on the 27th, the night before the known date. The show was specially O2, to thank the workers involved in the redevelopment of the arena and the local community.

Snow Patrol returned to Bangor, hometown to founding members Lightbody and Quinn in September. They organized a mini festival, which featured various support acts – Ash, The Dead 60s, Simple Kid, Kowalski and We Are Scientists.

Tour dates

Festivals
Snow Patrol made appearances at various music festivals throughout the tour for Eyes Open. Keyboardist Tom Simpson was arrested on 7 July 2007, which put the band's headlining set the next day (at T in the Park) in jeopardy. He was held at London's Heathrow Airport on the suspicion of possessing Class A drugs, mere hours after the band played at Live Earth, which made him miss the Oxegen Festival performance that night. The band had started searching for a replacement for Simpson, who however was released in time to play at T in the Park.

The appearance at Bangkok's 100 Rock Festival marked the first time the band played in Southeast Asia. At Lollapalooza, the band was joined by Silversun Pickups' bassist Nikki Monninger to sing Martha Wainwright's vocal parts on "Set the Fire to the Third Bar".

Tour dates

Side shows
Snow Patrol played a special surprise acoustic set a day before their headlining set at SXSW 2006.
After the band's performance at Splendour in the Grass, the band played two side-shows in Australia before heading to South Korea for the Pentaport Rock Festival. Starky supported them on both dates, apart from the concert at the Splendour in the Grass festival.

Tour dates

Charity events
Snow Patrol played an intimate charity show at Rock City on 16 July. The show was organized in aid of Cancerbackup, who provide information and support for cancer sufferers and their families. All proceeds from the show went to Cancerbackup. The band played a special, intimate acoustic show on 3 March in aid of friend, photographer Diana Gualda, who suffers from multiple sclerosis. The band also played at Live Earth, an annual event developed to combat climate change. Keyboardist Tom Simpson was arrested a few hours after playing at the event.

Tour dates

Australian Tour (Leg II) and end of tour
Snow Patrol returned to Australia in September, to headline their biggest tour down under at the time. Support for the tour came from Silversun Pickups, who had previously supported the band on their North American Tour, and Iain Archer, past touring member and songwriting collaborator. Two dates in New Zealand were announced later. This marked only the second time the band had toured there. Support for the dates came from Iain Archer and Opshop on one date.

This leg of the Australian Tour marked the end of the touring for Eyes Open''. The tour officially ended on 22 September 2007. To mark the event, Gary Lightbody posted a blog on Snow Patrol's official website about his experience in Australia and discussed the band's future plans.

Tour dates

Typical set list
"Hands Open"
"Chocolate"
"It's Beginning to Get to Me"
"Headlights on Dark Roads"
"Signal Fire"
"Grazed Knees"
"How To Be Dead"
"Tiny Little Fractures"
"Spitting Games"
"Chasing Cars"
"Shut Your Eyes"
"Make this Go on Forever"
"Set the Fire to the Third Bar"
"Run"
Encore
<li>"The Finish Line"
<li>"Open Your Eyes"
<li>"You're All I Have"

Tour Reporter
The Eyes Open Tour was the first Snow Patrol tour to feature tour reporters. It was first introduced ahead of the North American Tour of 2006. Fans interested in becoming tour reporters were required to fill in their details and tell why they were the ones for the job. One winner was chosen from each town where the band was to play a show. Each tour reporter received two tickets and a photo pass for the respective show. They were required to send the band photos of the show and write a blog sharing their experience. The photos and blogs were then posted on Snow Patrol's official website.

The idea was a success, so the same concept was again introduced for the next leg of the tour, which saw the band play in Europe. The next leg, the UK & Ireland Winter Arena Tour also featured fan tour reporters. This time, two fans were chosen as winners for each show to be the official Snow Patrol Tour Reporters.

Snow Patrol took the tour reporter feature "to the next level" for the Australian, New Zealand, Japanese and North American tours of February–April 2007. This time, two fans are chosen as winners for each date specifically to handle the job of reporter and photographer. The method of applying for the job was the same as before. This feature was dubbed as "Tour Reporter Pro", and it saw Diana Gualda cover her own benefit show. As the time came for Snow Patrol to play at the Isle of Wight Festival, a new feature of the tour reporter, dubbed "Tour Reporter Lite" was introduced. This enabled anybody who was to see the band perform at the festival to share their experience and photos from the event with everyone. Fans were required to log in the member's area and post in the tour reporters section.

References

External links

2006 concert tours
2007 concert tours
Snow Patrol concert tours